This article lists political parties in Chad.

Chad is a one party dominant state with the Patriotic Salvation Movement in power. Opposition parties are allowed, but are widely considered to have no real chance of gaining power.

The parties

Parliamentary parties
Patriotic Salvation Movement (Mouvement patriotique de salut)
Rally for Democracy and Progress (Rassemblement pour la démocratie et le progrès)
Federation, Action for the Republic (Fédération, action pour la république)
National Rally for Development and Progress (VIVA-Rassemblement national pour le développement et le progrès)
National Union for Democracy and Renewal (Union nationale pour la démocratie et le renouveau)
Union for Renewal and Democracy (Union pour le Rénouveau et la démocratie)
Chadian Action for Unity and Socialism (Action Tchadienne pour l'unité et le socialisme)
Action for Renewal of Chad (Action pour le renouveau du Tchad)
People's Movement for Democracy in Chad (Mouvement populaire pour la démocratie au Tchad)
National Democratic and Federal Convention (Convention nationale démocratique et fédérale)
National Democratic and Social Convention (Convention national démocratique et sociale)
Rally for the Republic – Lingui (Rassemblement pour la République - Lingui)
National Rally of Chadian Democrats (Rassemblement national pour la démocratie au Tchad - le Réveil)
National Union (Union nationale)
Rally of Democratic Forces in Chad (Rassemblement des forces démocratiques au Tchad)

Other parties
Renewed African Socialist Movement
Socialist Party without Borders (Parti Socialiste sans Frontières)

Defunct parties
Chadian Democratic Union (Union Démocratique Tchadienne)
Chadian National Union (Union Nationale Tchadienne)
Chadian Progressive Party (Parti Progressiste Tchadienne)
Chadian Social Action (Action Sociale Tchadienne)

See also

 Lists of political parties

Political parties
Chad
 
Political parties
Chad